The 2021 Vaahteraliiga season was the 42nd season of the Vaahteraliiga, the highest level of American football in Finland. The regular season took place between July 26 and September 4, 2021. The Finnish Champion was determined in the playoffs, and at the championship game Vaahteramalja XLII the Kuopio Steelers defeated the Helsinki Roosters. It was the Steelers' second straight championship title.

Standings

Playoffs

References

American football in Finland
Vaahteraliiga
Vaahteraliiga